Sanjeeva Uchil (died 24 February 2006) was an Indian football goalkeeper who represented India at the 1948 Summer Olympics in London.

His origins are from the southern Indian city of Mangalore in Karnataka state.

Honours

India
 Colombo Cup: 1953, 1954, 1955

References

External links
 

Indian footballers
2006 deaths
Year of birth missing
India international footballers
Olympic footballers of India
Footballers at the 1948 Summer Olympics
People from Udupi district
Footballers from Karnataka
Footballers at the 1954 Asian Games
Asian Games competitors for India
Association football goalkeepers